"Girl on Fire" is a song recorded by American singer-songwriter Alicia Keys for her fifth studio album of the same name. Keys co-wrote and co-produced the R&B ballad with Jeff Bhasker and Salaam Remi. The song contains an interpolation of the drums from the 1980 song "The Big Beat" by American rock guitarist Billy Squier, who received a writing credit on "Girl on Fire". Released on September 4, 2012, as the lead single from the album, "Girl on Fire" is Keys' first release under RCA Records following the closure of J Records, after a reorganization at Sony Music Entertainment.

"Girl on Fire" was inspired by Keys' giving birth to her son Egypt and marriage to husband Swizz Beatz. Keys recorded a three-track suite for the song, consisting of the main version in addition to two remixes. The first remix, titled "Inferno", adds two new verses from American hip hop artist Nicki Minaj, whilst the second mix titled "Bluelight" strips back the drums and piano leaving a sparse bass-led production and re-recorded "smokey" vocals. "Girl on Fire" opened to extremely positive reviews from critics, with many praising Keys' vocals and the song's production. Keys performed "Girl on Fire" for the first time at the 2012 MTV Video Music Awards on September 6, 2012, where she was joined by Minaj and American gymnastics gold-medalist Gabby Douglas. The song has been certified six-times platinum by the Recording Industry Association of America.

Background and release 
"Girl on Fire" is the lead single and title track from Alicia Keys' fifth studio album, Girl on Fire (2012). Alongside the main single, Keys recorded two other versions: the Inferno Remix which features new verses from Nicki Minaj and a Bluelight Remix which strips back the vocals and production from the main single. Gerrick Kennedy from the LA Times spoke of the multiple versions of the song commenting that the main single was most likely made for pop radio, but noted that Minaj's verses on the Inferno Remix would probably get noticed more. On being able to premiere her new song at the 2012 MTV Video Music Awards, Keys said,

Music and lyrics

Main version 
"Girl on Fire" is a midtempo song written by Keys, Jeff Bhasker, Salaam Remi and American rock guitarist Billy Squier. Squier earns a writing credit for the inclusion of an interpolation of the drums from his 1980 song "The Big Beat". Composed on the key of A major, "Girl on Fire" uses common time and is set to a "heavy beat" at a tempo of 93 beats per minute. Keys' vocals range in the song over an octave from a low note of C4 up to a high note of E5. On the main single, Keys opens the songs with the lyrics "She got both feet on the ground and she's burning it down. She got her head in the clouds and she's not backing down. This girl is on fire!" Keys' lyrics centre around toasting the "achievements of women everywhere", particularly with the hook "She's just a girl and she's on fire", which according to MTV's Rob Markman is delivered with a "calming-yet-commanding wail". Markman also spoke of the pace of the song, describing it as "pulsating". LA Times Gerrick Kennedy expanded further describing the songs components as "a fierce battlecry over a fast-building simplistic hook". Critics likened "Girl on Fire" to Keys' previous singles "No One" (2007) and "Try Sleeping with a Broken Heart" (2009). Throwing "If I Ain't Got You" (2004) into the list of comparisons, Erin Thompson from Seattle Weekly said "Girl on Fire" compares to previous Keys' ballads with its "quiet, unassuming verses leading into big, empathic choruses."

Inferno version 

The Inferno version features Nicki Minaj, who wrote and rapped two new verses on the song. Minaj's vocals were recorded at Chalice Recording Studios in Los Angeles, California. The inferno remix uses the same production and sample as the main single however, the first two verses of the song were described as "understated" by Carl Williot from Idolator, with Minaj leading the remix with a new rap verse. She raps "Took me on the balcony, telling me to jump with her/ Yeah I'm in the ghost but I ain't doing stunts with her/ I ain't trying to be that, haters want to see that/ But I got 'em aggy, cause I win the gold like Gabby". Minaj also talks about being haunted by the ghost of Marilyn Monroe. In the second verse from Minaj, the subject matter switches to her fans the "Barbz" with the lyric "And to my core fans, keep reppin' me/ Do it till the death of me/ 'X' in the box, cause ain't nobody checkin' me." Markman noted that in this verse, Minaj switched her delivery style to "more of a whisper". Entertainment Weeklys Kyle Anderson described Minaj's verses as "more prominent" than Keys' and noted that the production was influenced by garage music.

Bluelight version 
By contrast, the Bluelight version features a slower production and re-recorded vocals. According to the Los Angeles Times Gerrick Kennedy, the Bluelight remix has a production based on "dripping" synths and "light" chord progressions. Kennedy particularly noted a difference in Keys' vocal tone, describing it as "smokey" and comparable to that see on Keys' 2009 single "Un-Thinkable (I'm Ready)". Mark Edward Nero from About.com also compared the "Girl on Fire" to Keys' single "You Don't Know My Name" (2003). Idolator's Carl Williot described how on this stripped version, "gone is Minaj, gone are the piano plinks and gone are the martial drums" completely changing the composition of the Bluelight version. Williot described how Keys' vocals take on a "more emotional performance" while the melody is replaced with "faint bass drops and a hushed drum machine".

Reception

Critical response 
The song received universal acclaim. Jon Pareles from the New York Times described "Girl on Fire" and the previously released song "New Day" as "booming anthems" and the complete opposite to Girl on Fires ballads which feature just Keys' vocals and a piano. Rob Markman from MTV's RapFix blog described "Girl on Fire" as a "high-powered Alicia ballad" just like previous singles "No One" and "Try Sleeping with a Broken Heart". Agreeing with those comparisons was Gerrick Kennedy from the LA Times who went on to describe the main single as a "sweeping ballad with powerful vocals and an anthemic hook". Then commenting on the remixes Kennedy said that on the Inferno remix, Minaj's "fluid verses" and an "added thump" might make that version of the song get noticed more, while it's the Bluelight version Kennedy called the "most intoxicating". On the latter Kennedy said "it would be unfortunate to overlook" due to Keys' sensual vocal tone. Kyle Anderson from Entertainment Weekly commented that the "hook was weak" and that Minaj verses were much stronger, supporting the song.

By contrast, Charley Rogulewski from Vibe said it was "Keys who stands out on the track. [She] lays down powerful and flawless vocals over her trademark piano punches and a trash-can-lid beat." Erin Thompson from Seattle Weekly praised Keys' on the song for making the "often cheesy" girlpower theme seem "genuinely stirring and elegant", commenting that "only Alicia Keys could do it". Describing the chorus of the song, Thompson said "it booms with thudding drums as her drawn-out notes soar on top. It's heavily bombastic, but the drama of it makes it memorable, and the hooky melody is beautiful and exhilarating. Keys seems to have to set out to make a statement song about power, and it's undeniable that she's succeeded in that". Speaking of the song's inferno remix, Idolator's Carl Williot agreed with previous reviewers particularly noting Keys' vocals, using term "trademark soaring vocals" to describe Keys' performance on the song.

Commercial performance 
In the chart week ending September 7, 2012, "Girl on Fire" debuted on the US Hot R&B/Hip-Hop Songs chart at number 67. This in part was driven by 2.1 million radio impressions according to Nielsen BDS. The song rose to number seven in its fifth week, becoming her fifteenth Top 10 hit on the Billboard Hot R&B/Hip-Hop Songs chart, peaking at number 2 behind Rihanna's Diamonds. It has peaked at number 11 on the Billboard Hot 100 chart, and has sold 2 million copies in the United States as of February 13, 2013. The song has also become an international hit for Keys, reaching number one in Austria, South Korea, and Slovakia, the Top 5 in the Netherlands, Brazil, Israel, Denmark, Japan, Germany, Switzerland, France, and the United Kingdom, and a Top 20 hit in the US, Australia, Belgium, Canada, Czech Republic, Ireland, New Zealand, Norway, Scotland, Italy, Finland, Hungary, and Spain.

The song was included in a popular Brazilian soap opera, Salve Jorge, which contributed for the success in Brazil. It was also featured in the credits for Borderlands 3.

Music videos 
The music video for the song, premiered on BET's 106 & Park on October 19, 2012, and was directed by Sophie Muller. The video portrays Keys as a working mother caring for her kids and an elderly mother, has received wide acclaim from critics. Christopher Farley from the Wall Street Journal was of the opinion that Keys is making 21st century domesticity sexy, and is "an intriguing move for a pop-soul star". Rolling Stone magazine says Keys "applies glamour and magic to household chores", and made reference to Mary Poppins being an inspiration in the videos magic scene.

The video for the Inferno remix was uploaded to VEVO on November 2, 2012. It is much the same video as the main version but with Minaj's scenes pasted in the video. With Minaj's first verse, she appears in front of a red and black wall wearing a black and white outfit. In Minaj's second verse, we see her singing on a TV screen wearing a black outfit and having a starry night sky behind her. A completely new video was released for Japan in January 2013.

Live performances 
Keys performed "Girl on Fire" for the first time at 2012 MTV Video Music Awards on September 6, 2012, at the Staples Center in Los Angeles, California. She was joined by Nicki Minaj who rapped her verses from the Inferno Remix of the song as well as the 2012 Summer Olympics gymnastics gold medalist Gabby Douglas who performed during the second half of the song. The Team USA female gymnasts performed a brief routine while Keys was introduced to the stage. Keys was dressed in a "pewter-colored top and black form-fitting tights." Minaj was dressed in a "black hooded top and bright blonde wig". During the performance, Keys began stood up at a keyboard before walking down the steps to the main stage. It was only after Minaj rapped the line "But I got 'em aggy, cause I win the gold like Gabby", Douglas appear on stage with a brief routine containing cartwheels, jumps and back hand springs. American Superstar magazine described the performance a "true TV performance" thanks in part Minaj and Douglas, as well as "Keys hit[ting] many high notes — and then some". The magazine concluded that the performance was "sexy, yet intimate". Jack Antonoff, guitarist of indie band fun., said he thought Keys' performance could be "that performance that people will be talking about for 10 years". VH1's Sabrina Rojas Weiss agreed, stating that it was "just due to Keys' soaring vocals" but also Douglas' surprise appearance.

"Girl on Fire" was performed on ITunes Festival on September 28, 2012. Keys performed the song live on the UK version of The X Factor on November 18. On November 12, 2012, Alicia Performed New Music like "Girl On Fire" and another new song off her upcoming album titled "Brand New Me" + Our Favorites On VH1 Storytellers. On November 11, 2012, Alicia took the MTV Europe Music Awards stage by storm  with a jaw-dropping performance of her new songs "New Day" and "Girl On Fire"  On November 20 at 7:00 PM EST, Alicia exclusively performed on YouTube Live Stream with Google+ Hangout, also premiering her new album, "Girl on Fire" for the very first time. The "Girl On Fire" singer performed on November 26, 2012, on Good Morning America, as well as November 29, 2012 on The X Factor USA. On January 21, 2013, Keys sang the song with modified lyrics during President Barack Obama's Inaugural Balls, which celebrated his second term. On January 25, 2013, Keys did a medley of the song with "New Day" and "Brand New Me" at Los Premios 40 Principales in Spain. The next day, she sang "Girl on Fire" in Cannes, France, during the NRJ Music Awards. At the 2013 Grammy Awards, she performed the song and "Daylight" with Maroon 5. The song is performed on The Alicia + Keys World Tour.

Cover versions 
On September 2012, Misha B covered the track.  One critic described the acoustic cover as that "awkward moment when someone sings your new song better than you". American drag queens Willam Belli, Detox and Vicky Vox released a parody of the song, titled "Boy Is a Bottom" on January 26, 2013. Willam Belli later on released a Spanish version of "Boy Is a Bottom", called "Es Una Pasiva", on January 13, 2015.

Use in media
In March 2023, Lloyds Bank began airing a television commercial, in the United Kingdom, that heavily used "Girl on Fire" as the advert's soundtrack. The song saw increased popularity in that country, and, on 17 March 2023, "Girl on Fire" charted at number 19 on the UK Singles Downloads Chart.

Track listings 
 Digital Single
"Girl on Fire" (Main Version) – 3:44

Digital Single – Inferno
"Girl on Fire" (Inferno Version; featuring Nicki Minaj) – 4:30

Digital Single – Bluelight
"Girl on Fire" (Bluelight Version) – 4:22

Germany, Austria, and Switzerland CD single
"Girl on Fire" – 3:44
"Girl on Fire" (Inferno Version; featuring Nicki Minaj) – 4:30

Digital EP
"Girl on Fire" (Main Version) – 3:44
"Girl on Fire" (Inferno Version; featuring Nicki Minaj) – 4:30
"Girl on Fire" (Bluelight Version) – 4:22
"Girl on Fire" (Instrumental) – 3:45

Credits and personnel 
Recording
 Recorded at Jungle City Studios (NYC), Oven Studios (NYC) & The Record Plant (Los Angeles, CA)

Personnel

 Producer, writer, lead & background vocals – Alicia Keys
 Producer, writer, CP-70 piano, organ – Jeff Bhasker
 Producer, writer, drum-programming – Salaam Remi
 Writer – Billy Squier
 Big drums – Dylan Wissing

 Engineered and recorded by Ann Mincieli
Big drums engineered by Ken Lewis
Assistant engineers – Val Brathwaite, Ramon Rivas, Ghazi Hourani
Mixed by Manny Marroquin
Mix assistant – Chris Galland

Charts

Weekly charts

Year-end charts

Certifications

See also 
List of number-one hits of 2012 (Austria)
List of singles certified multi-platinum in Australia
List of number-one pop hits of 2013 (Brazil)
List of best-selling singles in 2012 (France)
List of top 10 singles in 2012 (France)
List of top 10 singles in 2013 (France)
List of number-one singles of 2013 (Slovakia)
List of number-one singles of 2012 (Slovakia)
List of number-one international songs of 2012 (South Korea)
List of number-one singles of 2012 (Spain)
List of UK top 10 singles in 2012
Billboard Year-End Hot 100 singles of 2013

Radio adds and release history

References

External links 
Girl On Fire (Bluelight Version) (Audio) on YouTube
Girl On Fire (Inferno Version) (Audio) on YouTube
Girl On Fire (Inferno Version) Music video on YouTube

2012 songs
2012 singles
Alicia Keys songs
Songs written by Alicia Keys
Songs written by Jeff Bhasker
Songs written by Salaam Remi
Songs written by Billy Squier
Song recordings produced by Alicia Keys
Song recordings produced by Jeff Bhasker
Song recordings produced by Salaam Remi
RCA Records singles
Music videos directed by Sophie Muller
Number-one singles in Austria
Contemporary R&B ballads
Nicki Minaj songs
Songs with feminist themes
2010s ballads